This article contains contestant information and episode summaries from Season 2 of the Estonian competitive science television series Rakett69. Season 1 aired starting on January 14, 2012 and concluded on April 21, 2012.

The show was divided into 16 episodes, each about 27 minutes long. Parallel to the TV show, an internet show also aired on The official homepage

Contestants 

The 15 contestants, who got through the talent show, were initially divided into the Green team, the Orange team and the Blue team.

Episodes 
Each episode consisted of three challenges, one contestant had to leave each episode.

Episode 1 
 Theme: Talent show
 Original airdate: January 7.
 Challenge: In the first episode, 30 contestants had to impress the judges with a short presentation. Most of the presentations were either physical or chemical experiments. 15 contestants were chosen to compete in the first season.

Episode 2 
 Theme: History
 Original airdate: January 14.
 Challenges: The contestants were divided into three teams with the help of robot Oskar.

The first challenge was to measure the distance of a hammer without stepping away from the table.

The second challenge was to light a candle using the various given materials.

The third challenge was to purify a cup of contaminated water.

 Result: The Blue team lost and Kristjan was sent home.

References 

2012 Estonian television seasons
2000s Estonian television series
2012 Estonian television series debuts